The 1949 Australian federal election was held in Australia on 10 December 1949. All 121 seats in the House of Representatives and 42 of the 60 seats in the Senate were up for election. The incumbent Labor Party, led by Prime Minister Ben Chifley, was defeated by the opposition Liberal–Country coalition under Robert Menzies. Menzies became prime minister for a second time, his first period having ended in 1941. This election marked the end of the 8-year Curtin-Chifley Labor Government that had been in power since 1941 and started the 23-year Liberal/Country Coalition Government. This was the first time the Liberal party won government at the federal level.

The number of MPs in both houses had been increased at the election, and single transferable vote under a proportional voting system had been introduced in the Senate. Though Labor lost government, Labor retained a Senate majority at the election. However, this ended at the 1951 election. With the Senate changes in place, Labor has not held a Senate majority since.

Future Prime Ministers William McMahon and John Gorton both entered parliament at this election.

Issues
The election hinged on the policies of the Federal Labor Government, especially bank nationalisation. Prime Minister Chifley intended to bring all of the banks under Government control, a socialist policy which the Coalition argued was not in the country's interest. The Coalition promised to end unpopular wartime rationing. The election took place against the background of the 1949 Australian coal strike, the developing Cold War and growing fears of communism.

Robert Menzies broke new ground in using the radio as his primary method of reaching voters.

Electoral reform
As of this election, single transferable vote with proportional representation became the method for electing the Senate. This was to try to prevent the Senate from being dominated by one party, which had often occurred previously. For example, coming into this election the ALP held 33 of the 36 Senate seats, whilst the conservatives at the 1919 election held 35 of the 36 Senate seats. In addition, the House of Representatives was enlarged from 74 to 121 seats and the Senate from 36 to 60 members. All 121 lower house seats, and 42 of the 60 upper house seats, were up for election.

Opinion polling

Results

House of Representatives

Senate

Seats changing hands

 Members listed in italics did not contest their seat at this election.

Significance
The Chifley Government was defeated, ending the longest period of Labor Federal Government in Australian history up to that date (1941–49). Labor would not return to office until 1972. Robert Menzies became Prime Minister for the second time, and the Liberal Party of Australia won government federally for the first time.

See also
 Candidates of the Australian federal election, 1949
 Members of the Australian House of Representatives, 1949–1951
 Members of the Australian Senate, 1950–1951

Notes

References

Sources
 
University of WA  election results in Australia since 1890
AEC 2PP vote
Prior to 1984 the AEC did not undertake a full distribution of preferences for statistical purposes. The stored ballot papers for the 1983 election were put through this process prior to their destruction. Therefore, the figures from 1983 onwards show the actual result based on full distribution of preferences.
Two-party-preferred vote since 1940

Federal elections in Australia
1949 elections in Australia
December 1949 events in Australia